Kesma is a rural locality (a selo) in Vesyegonsky District of Tver Oblast, Russia.

On March 5, 1935, Ovinishchensky District with the administrative center in Kesma was established on the territories which were previously a part of Vesyegonsky and Krasnokholmsky Districts. On July 4, 1956, the district was abolished and split between Vesyegonsky and Krasnokholmsky Districts.

References

Notes

Sources

Rural localities in Vesyegonsky District
Vesyegonsky Uyezd